Kajabad (also Romanized as Kajābād) is a village in Kakhk Rural District, Kakhk District, Gonabad County, Razavi Khorasan Province, Iran. At the 2006 census, its population was 33, in 11 families.

References 

Populated places in Gonabad County